Ropica palauana is a species of beetle in the family Cerambycidae. It was described by Matsushita in 1935.

References

palauana
Beetles described in 1935